Hippasteria phrygiana is a sea star species, member of the Goniasteridae family.

Description and characteristics 
This species grows up to 20 cm in diameter, with short arms and a large body. The upper surface is red and covered with rounded knob-like spines; the lower surface contains many macroscopic bivalved pedicellariae.

Habitat and geographic range 
This species is incredibly widely distributed: it is present in the 3 main oceanic basins.

It lives mostly in cold and deep waters.

Biology 
This species feeds mostly on cnidarians, especially deep-sea corals.

See also

References

External links 

 Habitas entry
 Catalog of Life entry
 National Center for Biotechnology Information search
 Seawater.no entry

Hippasteria
Animals described in 1758
Taxa named by Carl Linnaeus